The 1996 Taça de Portugal Final was the final match of the 1995–96 Taça de Portugal, the 56th season of the Taça de Portugal, the premier Portuguese football cup competition organized by the Portuguese Football Federation (FPF). The match was played on 18 May 1996 at the Estádio Nacional in Oeiras, and opposed two Primeira Liga sides Benfica and Sporting CP. Benfica defeated Sporting CP 3–1 to claim the Taça de Portugal for a twenty third time in their history.

In Portugal, the final was televised live on RTP. As a result of winning the Taça de Portugal, Benfica qualified for the 1996 Supertaça Cândido de Oliveira, where they faced 1995–96 Primeira Divisão winners Porto.

Match

Details

See also
 Derby de Lisboa

References

1996
1995–96 in Portuguese football
S.L. Benfica matches
Sporting CP matches